is a passenger railway station located in the city of Warabi, Saitama, Japan, operated by East Japan Railway Company (JR East).

Lines
Warabi Station is served by the Keihin-Tōhoku Line linking Saitama Prefecture with central Tokyo and Kanagawa Prefecture, and is located 19.7 kilometers from Tokyo Station.

Layout
The station has one island platform serving two tracks, with an elevated station building. The station has a Midori no Madoguchi staffed ticket office.

Platforms

History 
The station opened on 16 July 1893. With the privatization of JNR on 1 April 1987, the station came under the control of JR East.

Passenger statistics 
In fiscal 2019, the station was used by an average of 61,829 passengers daily (boarding passengers only).

Surrounding area
Warabi City Hall
Warabi Post Office
site of Warabi-shuku
Warabi City Hospital

See also
List of railway stations in Japan

References

External links

JR East Station Information

Railway stations in Saitama Prefecture
Keihin-Tōhoku Line
Stations of East Japan Railway Company
Railway stations in Japan opened in 1893
Warabi, Saitama